This is a list of radio stations in the state of Aguascalientes, Mexico, which can be sorted by their call signs, frequencies, location, ownership, names, and programming formats.

Notes

References

Aguascalientes